IITRAN is a discontinued programming language created in the mid-1960s.  It was designed as a first language for students, and its syntax resembled that of PL/I.  The name derives from Illinois Institute of Technology, where it was developed.

The IITRAN language was initially implemented on an IBM System/360 DOS system.  In the early 1970s, the IBM platform proved to be too small for the IIT environment and the hardware was upgraded.  A new version was developed for the Univac 1108 platform.  The language itself did not change but with the new hardware, a new implementation of the IITran software was developed.

IITRAN was designed and developed in response to the increasing demand for a computer language which would meet the following specifications:

It should be clear, concise, and easily learned, even for those who have had no previous experience with computers or mathematics;
It should bear as close a resemblance as possible to the English language;
It should be free of awkward restrictions and limitations;
It should be consistent with mathematical and logical foundations;
It should allow processing of a great number of individual programs in a very short time;
It should serve as a computational tool for students of science and engineering;
It should process a clear, easily understood, set of diagnostic error messages.
(Bauer, p. V)

There was a Spanish language version of IITRAN at IIT as well. It utilized Spanish keywords rather than English ones. For example, the keyword read was replaced by leer.

Bibliography
IITRAN / 360: Self-Instructional Manual and Text,  Bauer, Charles R. et al.,  Addison Wesley Publishing, 1967. 
The IITRAN Programming Language, R. Dewar et al., CACM 12(10):569-575 (Oct 1969).

Educational programming languages
PL/I programming language family